Lega Padana (Padanian League) is a Padanist and separatist political party founded in 1999 and active mainly in Piedmont, Italy.

In the 2009 provincial elections, the piedmontese section of the party, the Piedmont Padanian League (Lega Padana Piemont) obtained 1.1% of the vote in the Province of Alessandria and 1.0% in the Province of Turin. Renzo Rabellino, who was a joint-candidate of several small parties, won 3.5% of the vote and he was elected to the Provincial Council of Turin. In the 2010 Piedmontese regional election Rabellino ran for president and gained 1.7%. In 2011 Turin municipal election the candidate supported by LPP, Domenico Coppola, won 3.6% of the vote. Coppola, who had been elected to the Municipal Council, died a few days later the election.

See also
Lega Padana Lombardia

References

Political parties in Piedmont
Padanian independence activists